Indian Institute of Information Technology Kota (IIIT, Kota) is one of the Indian Institutes of Information Technology proposed to be located at Ranpur near Kota, Rajasthan. IIIT Kota is a joint venture of the Ministry of Human Resource Development, Government of India with Industries in Public-Private Partnership model. First batch of IIIT Kota has graduated in the year 2017. IIITK offers technical courses for CSE and ECE branches, with creative project courses.
Every year IIITK celebrates its Foundation Day in April.
After the IIIT Act was passed in the Parliament in 2017, IIITK has become an "Institute of National Importance", equalling in status with the NITs and IITs, with power of offering degrees officially.

History 
The academic session of IIIT Kota started from its temporary campus at Malaviya National Institute of Technology Jaipur from year 2013.

Seats

There are 180 seats in IIIT Kota. Currently seat matrix in IIIT Kota is:Computer Science & Engineering: 120seatsElectronics & Communication Engineering:60 seatsAdmission process in IIIT Kota is through Josaa and csab

Building Status at Permanent Campus 
As of now, IIIT Kota does not have its own building. It is being operated from the premises of the mentor institute (MNIT Jaipur). However the boundary wall along with tree plantation has been completed in its permanent campus at Ranpur near Kota. Further, the director office, conference hall, accounts and establishment block, academic block with adequate number of lecture theatres, labs and faculty cabins, seminar hall with capacity of more than 200 persons, computer center, library, workshop and store, boys and girls hostels, guest house, director's and staff residencies, transit accommodation and other development work such as rain water harvesting structure, sewerage treatment plant, overhead tank are to be taken up in the phased manner on receipt of required funds from the central and state governments for which the matter is under vigorous pursuance with the authorities concerned.

References

External links
 

Kota
Universities and colleges in Kota, Rajasthan
2013 establishments in Rajasthan
Educational institutions established in 2013